A Ländchen is the German name given to several Ice Age plateaux in the Havelland region, which climb to over 70 metres above the formerly marshy urstromtal levels (old glacial meltwater valleys) of the Havelland Luch and the Rhinluch. The difference between these Ländchen and the surrounding countryside is even more marked because of the different land uses to which they are put. Extensive pastures in the lowlands contrast with the arable fields and woods on the low hills. Geologically they are largely complete formations of ground moraine from the  Saale and Weichselian glaciations that, in places, are covered by gently rolling end moraines.

Their names are:
 Ländchen Bellin near Fehrbellin 
 Ländchen Friesack near Friesack 
 Ländchen Glien near Paaren im Glien north of Falkensee 
 Ländchen Rhinow near Rhinow near the confluence of the Rhin and the Havel 
 Land Schollene between Havel and the Elbe valley, west of Rathenow 
 Ribbeck Heath, part of the Nauen Plateau 
 Zootzen north of Friesack, scarcely higher than the Luche

Sources
Topographic map, 1:100,000 series, Sheets C 3538 Brandenburg an der Havel and C 3542 Berlin West, both from LGB Brandenburg

Geography of Brandenburg
Regions of Brandenburg
Landforms
Havelland